James Lowery Donaldson Morrison (April 12, 1816 – August 14, 1888) was a U.S. Representative from Illinois.

Born in Kaskaskia, Illinois, Morrison was appointed midshipman in the Navy in 1832 and served until December 31, 1839, when he resigned.
He studied law.
He was admitted to the bar and commenced practice in Belleville, Illinois.
He served as member of the State house of representatives in 1844.
Raised a company and served in the Mexican War as lieutenant colonel of Bissell's regiment of Illinois Volunteers from July 1, 1846, to July 1, 1847.
He was presented a sword by the Illinois legislature for services at Buena Vista.
He served as member of the State senate in 1848.
He was an unsuccessful Whig candidate for Lieutenant Governor in 1852.

Morrison was elected as a Democrat to the Thirty-fourth Congress to fill the vacancy caused by the resignation of Lyman Trumbull and served from November 4, 1856 to March 3, 1857.
At the same election he was not the nominee for the Thirty-fifth Congress. He was an unsuccessful candidate for the Democratic nomination for Governor of Illinois in 1860. His wife, Mary, was the daughter of Thomas Carlin, who was governor from 1838 to 1942.

Morrison died in St. Louis, Missouri, on August 14, 1888 and was interred in Calvary Cemetery. Morrisonville, Illinois is named in his honor.

References

External links
 
 

1816 births
1888 deaths
United States Army officers
United States Navy officers
American military personnel of the Mexican–American War
Illinois Whigs
Illinois state senators
Democratic Party members of the United States House of Representatives from Illinois
Members of the Illinois House of Representatives
19th-century American politicians
People from Kaskaskia, Illinois
People from St. Clair County, Illinois
Military personnel from Illinois